A great power is a sovereign state that is recognized as having the ability and expertise to exert its influence on a global scale. Great powers characteristically possess military and economic strength, as well as diplomatic and soft power influence, which may cause middle or small powers to consider the great powers' opinions before taking actions of their own. International relations theorists have posited that great power status can be characterized into power capabilities, spatial aspects, and status dimensions.

While some nations are widely considered to be great powers, there is considerable debate on the exact criteria of great power status. Historically, the status of great powers has been formally recognized in organizations such as the Congress of Vienna or the United Nations Security Council. The United Nations Security Council, NATO Quint, the G7, the BRICs and the Contact Group have all been described as great power concerts.

The term "great power" was first used to represent the most important powers in Europe during the post-Napoleonic era. The "Great Powers" constituted the "Concert of Europe" and claimed the right to joint enforcement of the postwar treaties. The formalization of the division between small powers and great powers came about with the signing of the Treaty of Chaumont in 1814. Since then, the international balance of power has shifted numerous times, most dramatically during World War I and World War II. In literature, alternative terms for great power are often world power or major power.

Characteristics
There are no set or defined characteristics of a great power. These characteristics have often been treated as empirical, self-evident to the assessor. However, this approach has the disadvantage of subjectivity. As a result, there have been attempts to derive some common criteria and to treat these as essential elements of great power status. Danilovic (2002) highlights three central characteristics, which she terms as "power, spatial, and status dimensions," that distinguish major powers from other states. The following section ("Characteristics") is extracted from her discussion of these three dimensions, including all of the citations.

Early writings on the subject tended to judge states by the realist criterion, as expressed by the historian A. J. P. Taylor when he noted that "The test of a great power is the test of strength for war." Later writers have expanded this test, attempting to define power in terms of overall military, economic, and political capacity. Kenneth Waltz, the founder of the neorealist theory of international relations, uses a set of six criteria to determine great power: population and territory, resource endowment, military strength, economic capability, political stability and competence. 

John Mearsheimer defines great powers as those that "have sufficient military assets to put up a serious fight in an all-out conventional war against the most powerful state in the world."

Power dimensions

As noted above, for many, power capabilities were the sole criterion. However, even under the more expansive tests, power retains a vital place.

This aspect has received mixed treatment, with some confusion as to the degree of power required. Writers have approached the concept of great power with differing conceptualizations of the world situation, from multi-polarity to overwhelming hegemony. In his essay, 'French Diplomacy in the Postwar Period', the French historian Jean-Baptiste Duroselle spoke of the concept of multi-polarity: "A Great power is one which is capable of preserving its own independence against any other single power."

This differed from earlier writers, notably from Leopold von Ranke, who clearly had a different idea of the world situation. In his essay 'The Great Powers', written in 1833, von Ranke wrote: "If one could establish as a definition of a Great power that it must be able to maintain itself against all others, even when they are united, then Frederick has raised Prussia to that position." These positions have been the subject of criticism.

In 2011 the U.S. had 10 major strengths according to Chinese scholar Peng Yuan, the director of the Institute of American Studies of the China Institutes for Contemporary International Studies.  
1. Population, geographic position, and natural resources.
2. Military muscle.
3. High technology and education.
4. Cultural/soft power.
5. Cyber power.
6. Allies, the United States having more than any other state.
7. Geopolitical strength, as embodied in global projection forces.
8. Intelligence capabilities, as demonstrated by the killing of Osama bin Laden.
9. Intellectual power, fed by a plethora of U.S. think tanks and the “revolving door” between research institutions and government.
10. Strategic power, the United States being the world’s only country with a truly global strategy.
However he also noted where the U.S. had recently slipped: 
1. Political power, as manifested by the breakdown of bipartisanship.
2. Economic power, as illustrated by the post-2007 slowdown.
3. Financial power, given intractable deficits and rising debt.
4. Social power, as weakened by societal polarization.
5. Institutional power, since the United States can no longer dominate global institutions

Spatial dimension
All states have a geographic scope of interests, actions, or projected power. This is a crucial factor in distinguishing a great power from a regional power; by definition, the scope of a regional power is restricted to its region. It has been suggested that a great power should be possessed of actual influence throughout the scope of the prevailing international system. Arnold J. Toynbee, for example, observes that "Great power may be defined as a political force exerting an effect co-extensive with the widest range of the society in which it operates. The Great powers of 1914 were 'world-powers' because Western society had recently become 'world-wide'."

Other suggestions have been made that a great power should have the capacity to engage in extra-regional affairs and that a great power ought to be possessed of extra-regional interests, two propositions which are often closely connected.

Status dimension
Formal or informal acknowledgment of a nation's great power status has also been a criterion for being a great power. As political scientist George Modelski notes, "The status of Great power is sometimes confused with the condition of being powerful. The office, as it is known, did in fact evolve from the role played by the great military states in earlier periods... But the Great power system institutionalizes the position of the powerful state in a web of rights and obligations."

This approach restricts analysis to the epoch following the Congress of Vienna at which great powers were first formally recognized. In the absence of such a formal act of recognition it has been suggested that great power status can arise by implication by judging the nature of a state's relations with other great powers.

A further option is to examine a state's willingness to act as a great power. As a nation will seldom declare that it is acting as such, this usually entails a retrospective examination of state conduct. As a result, this is of limited use in establishing the nature of contemporary powers, at least not without the exercise of subjective observation.

Other important criteria throughout history are that great powers should have enough influence to be included in discussions of contemporary political and diplomatic questions, and exercise influence on the outcome and resolution. Historically, when major political questions were addressed, several great powers met to discuss them. Before the era of groups like the United Nations, participants of such meetings were not officially named but rather were decided based on their great power status. These were conferences that settled important questions based on major historical events.

History

Different sets of great, or significant, powers have existed throughout history. An early reference to great powers is from the 3rd century, when the Persian prophet Mani described Rome, China, Aksum, and Persia as the four greatest kingdoms of his time. During the Napoleonic  wars in Europe American diplomat James Monroe observed that, "The respect which one power has for another is in exact proportion of the means which they respectively have of injuring each other."  The term "great power" first appears at the Congress of Vienna in 1815. The Congress established the Concert of Europe as an attempt to preserve peace after the years of Napoleonic Wars.

Lord Castlereagh, the British foreign secretary, first used the term in its diplomatic context, writing on 13 February 1814: "there is every prospect of the Congress terminating with a general accord and Guarantee between the Great powers of Europe, with a determination to support the arrangement agreed upon, and to turn the general influence and if necessary the general arms against the Power that shall first attempt to disturb the Continental peace."

The Congress of Vienna consisted of five main powers: the Austrian Empire, France, Prussia, Russia, and Great Britain. These five primary participants constituted the original great powers as we know the term today. Other powers, such as Spain, Portugal, and Sweden, which were great powers during the 17th century and the earlier 18th century, were consulted on certain specific issues, but they were not full participants.

After the Congress of Vienna, Great Britain emerged as the pre-eminent global hegemon, due to it being the first nation to industrialize, possessing the largest navy, and the extent of its overseas empire, which ushered in a century of Pax Britannica. The balance of power between the Great Powers became a major influence in European politics, prompting Otto von Bismarck to say "All politics reduces itself to this formula: try to be one of three, as long as the world is governed by the unstable equilibrium of five great powers."

Over time, the relative power of these five nations fluctuated, which by the dawn of the 20th century had served to create an entirely different balance of power. Great Britain and the new German Empire (from 1871), experienced continued economic growth and political power. Others, such as Russia and Austria-Hungary, stagnated. At the same time, other states were emerging and expanding in power, largely through the process of industrialization. These countries seeking to attain great power status were: Italy after the Risorgimento era, Japan during the Meiji era, and the United States after its civil war. By 1900, the balance of world power had changed substantially since the Congress of Vienna. The Eight-Nation Alliance was an alliance of eight nations created in response to the Boxer Rebellion in China. It formed in 1900 and consisted of the five Congress powers plus Italy, Japan, and the United States, representing the great powers at the beginning of the 20th century.

World Wars

Shifts of international power have most notably occurred through major conflicts. The conclusion of World War I and the resulting treaties of Versailles, St-Germain, Neuilly, Trianon, and Sèvres made Great Britain, France, Italy, Japan, and the United States the chief arbiters of the new world order. The German Empire was defeated, Austria-Hungary was divided into new, less powerful states and the Russian Empire fell to revolution. During the Paris Peace Conference, the "Big Four" – Great Britain, France, Italy,  and the United States – controlled the proceedings and outcome of the treaties than Japan. The Big Four were the architects of the Treaty of Versailles which was signed by Germany; the Treaty of St. Germain, with Austria; the Treaty of Neuilly, with Bulgaria; the Treaty of Trianon, with Hungary; and the Treaty of Sèvres, with the Ottoman Empire. During the decision-making of the Treaty of Versailles, Italy pulled out of the conference because a part of its demands were not met and temporarily left the other three countries as the sole major architects of that treaty, referred to as the "Big Three".

The status of the victorious great powers were recognised by permanent seats at the League of Nations Council, where they acted as a type of executive body directing the Assembly of the League. However, the council began with only four permanent members – Great Britain, France, Italy, and Japan – because the United States, meant to be the fifth permanent member, never joined the League. Germany later joined after the Locarno Treaties, which made it a member of the League of Nations, and later left (and withdrew from the League in 1933); Japan left, and the Soviet Union joined.

When World War II started in 1939, it divided the world into two alliances: the Allies (initially the United Kingdom and France, China, followed in 1941 by the Soviet Union and the United States) and the Axis powers (Germany, Italy, and Japan). During World War II, the U.S., U.K., USSR, and China were referred as a "trusteeship of the powerful" and were recognized as the Allied "Big Four" in Declaration by United Nations in 1942. These four countries were referred as the "Four Policemen" of the Allies and considered as the primary victors of World War II. The importance of France was acknowledged by their inclusion, along with the other four, in the group of countries allotted permanent seats in the United Nations Security Council.

Since the end of the World Wars, the term "great power" has been joined by a number of other power classifications. Foremost among these is the concept of the superpower, used to describe those nations with overwhelming power and influence in the rest of the world. It was first coined in 1944 by William T. R. Fox and according to him, there were three superpowers: Great Britain, the United States, and the Soviet Union. But after World War II Britain lost its superpower status. The term middle power has emerged for those nations which exercise a degree of global influence but are insufficient to be decisive on international affairs. Regional powers are those whose influence is generally confined to their region of the world.

Cold War 

The Cold War was a period of geopolitical tension between the United States and the Soviet Union and their respective allies, the Western Bloc and the Eastern Bloc, which began following World War II. The term "cold" is used because there was no large-scale fighting directly between the two superpowers, but they each supported major regional conflicts known as proxy wars. The conflict was based around the ideological and geopolitical struggle for global influence by these two superpowers, following their temporary alliance and victory against Nazi Germany in 1945.

During the Cold War, Japan, France, the United Kingdom and West Germany rebuilt their economies. France and the United Kingdom maintained technologically advanced armed forces with power projection capabilities and maintain large defense budgets to this day. Yet, as the Cold War continued, authorities began to question if France and the United Kingdom could retain their long-held statuses as great powers. China, with the world's largest population, has slowly risen to great power status, with large growth in economic and military power in the post-war period. After 1949, the Republic of China began to lose its recognition as the sole legitimate government of China by the other great powers, in favour of the People's Republic of China. Subsequently, in 1971, it lost its permanent seat at the UN Security Council to the People's Republic of China.

Aftermath of the Cold War
China, France, Russia, the United Kingdom, and the United States are often referred to as great powers by academics due to "their political and economic dominance of the global arena". These five nations are the only states to have permanent seats with veto power on the UN Security Council. They are also the only state entities to have met the conditions to be considered "Nuclear Weapons States" under the Treaty on the Non-Proliferation of Nuclear Weapons, and maintain military expenditures which are among the largest in the world. However, there is no unanimous agreement among authorities as to the current status of these powers or what precisely defines a great power. For example, sources have at times referred to China, France, Russia and the United Kingdom as middle powers.
Following the dissolution of the Soviet Union, its UN Security Council permanent seat was transferred to the Russian Federation in 1991, as its largest successor state. The newly formed Russian Federation emerged on the level of a great power, leaving the United States as the only remaining global superpower (although some support a multipolar world view).

Japan and Germany are great powers too, though due to their large advanced economies (having the third and fourth largest economies respectively) rather than their strategic and hard power capabilities (i.e., the lack of permanent seats and veto power on the UN Security Council or strategic military reach). Germany has been a member together with the five permanent Security Council members in the P5+1 grouping of world powers. Like China, France, Russia, and the United Kingdom; Germany and Japan have also been referred to as middle powers.
In his 2014 publication Great Power Peace and American Primacy, Joshua Baron considers China, France, Russia, Germany, Japan, the United Kingdom and the United States as the current great powers.

Italy has been referred to as a great power by a number of academics and commentators throughout the post WWII era. The American international legal scholar Milena Sterio writes:   Sterio also cites Italy's status in the Group of Seven (G7) and the nation's influence in regional and international organizations for its status as a great power. Italy has been a member together with the five permanent Security Council members plus Germany in the International Support Group for Lebanon (ISG) grouping of world powers.  Some analysts assert that Italy is an "intermittent" or the "least of the great powers", while some others believe Italy is a middle or regional power.

In addition to these contemporary great powers mentioned above, Zbigniew Brzezinski and Mohan Malik consider India to be a great power too. Although unlike the contemporary great powers who have long been considered so, India's recognition among authorities as a great power is comparatively recent. However, there is no collective agreement among observers as to the status of India, for example, a number of academics believe that India is emerging as a great power, while some believe that India remains a middle power.

The United Nations Security Council, NATO Quint, the G7, the BRICs and the Contact Group have all been described as great power concerts.

A 2017 study by the Hague Centre for Strategic Studies qualified China, Europe, India, Japan, Russia and the United States as the current great powers.

Emerging powers

With continuing European integration, the European Union is increasingly being seen as a great power in its own right, with representation at the WTO and at G7 and G-20 summits. This is most notable in areas where the European Union has exclusive competence (i.e. economic affairs). It also reflects a non-traditional conception of Europe's world role as a global "civilian power", exercising collective influence in the functional spheres of trade and diplomacy, as an alternative to military dominance. The European Union is a supranational union and not a sovereign state and does not have its own foreign affairs or defence policies; these remain largely with the member states, which include France, Germany and, before Brexit, the United Kingdom (referred to collectively as the "EU three").

Brazil and India are widely regarded as emerging powers with the potential to be great powers. Political scientist Stephen P. Cohen asserts that India is an emerging power, but highlights that some strategists consider India to be already a great power. Some academics such as Zbigniew Brzezinski and David A. Robinson already regard India as a major or great power.
Former British Ambassador to Brazil, Peter Collecott identifies that Brazil's recognition as a potential great and superpower largely stems from its own national identity and ambition. Professor Kwang Ho Chun feels that Brazil will emerge as a great power with an important position in some spheres of influence. Others suggest India and Brazil may even have the potential to emerge as a superpower.

Permanent membership of the UN Security Council is widely regarded as being a central tenet of great power status in the modern world; Brazil, Germany, India and Japan form the G4 nations which support one another (and have varying degrees of support from the existing permanent members) in becoming permanent members. The G4 is opposed by the Italian-led Uniting for Consensus group. There are however few signs that reform of the Security Council will happen in the near future.

Israel and Iran are also mentioned in the context of great powers.

Hierarchy of great powers
The political scientist, geo-strategist, and former US National Security Advisor Zbigniew Brzezinski appraised the current standing of the great powers in his 2012 publication Strategic Vision: America and the Crisis of Global Power. In relation to great powers, he makes the following points:

According to a 2014 report of the Hague Centre for Strategic Studies:

See also 

 Big Four (Western Europe)
 Failed state
 G8
 Indo-Pacific
 List of modern great powers
 List of medieval great powers 
 List of ancient great powers 
 Power (international relations)
 Precedence among European monarchies
 International relations (1648–1814)
 International relations (1814–1919)
 Superpower
 Diplomatic history of World War I
 International relations (1919–1939)
 Diplomatic history of World War II
 History of United States foreign policy
 History of French foreign relations
 History of German foreign policy
 Foreign policy of the Russian Empire
 Foreign relations of the Soviet Union
 Historiography of the British Empire
 History of the foreign relations of the United Kingdom

Notes

References

Further reading

  Abbenhuis, Maartje. An Age of Neutrals Great Power Politics, 1815–1914 (2014)  excerpt
 Allison, Graham. "The New Spheres of Influence: Sharing the Globe with Other Great Powers." Foreign Affairs 99 (2020): 30+ online
 Bridge, Roy, and Roger Bullen, eds.  The Great Powers and the European States System 1814–1914 (2nd ed. 2004) excerpt
 Brooks, Stephen G., and William C. Wohlforth. "The rise and fall of the great powers in the twenty-first century: China's rise and the fate of America's global position." International Security 40.3 (2016): 7–53. online
 Dickson, Monday E. Dickson. "Great Powers and the Quest for Hegemony in the Contemporary International System." Advances in Social Sciences Research Journal 6.6 (2019): 168–176. online
 
 Edelstein, David M. Over the Horizon: Time, Uncertainty, and the Rise of Great Powers (Cornell UP, 2017).
 Efremova, Ksenia. "Small States in Great Power Politics: Understanding the" Buffer Effect"." Central European Journal of International & Security Studies 13.1 (2019) online.
 Eloranta, Jari, Eric Golson, Peter Hedberg, and Maria Cristina Moreira, eds. Small and Medium Powers in Global History: Trade, Conflicts, and Neutrality from the Eighteenth to the Twentieth Centuries (Routledge, 2018) 240 pp. online review
 Joffe, Josef. The Myth of America's Decline: Politics, Economics, and a Half Century of False Prophecies (2014) online
 Joffe, Josef. The Future of the great powers (1998) online 
 Kassab, Hanna Samir. Grand strategies of weak states and great powers (Springer, 2017).
 Kennedy, Paul. The Rise and Fall of the Great Powers (1987) online
 Langer, William, ed. (1973) An Encyclopedia Of World History (1948 And later editions) online
 Stearns, Peter, ed. The Encyclopedia of World History (2007), 1245pp; update of Langer
 
 Maass, Matthias. Small states in world politics: The story of small state survival, 1648–2016 (2017).
 Michaelis, Meir. "World Power Status or World Dominion? A Survey of the Literature on Hitler's 'Plan of World Dominion' (1937–1970)." Historical Journal 15#2 (1972): 331–60. online.
 Ogden, Chris. China and India: Asia's emergent great powers (John Wiley & Sons, 2017).
 Newmann, I.B. ed. Regional Great Powers in International Politics (1992)
 Schulz, Matthias. "A Balancing Act: Domestic Pressures and International Systemic Constraints in the Foreign Policies of the Great Powers, 1848–1851." German History 21.3 (2003): 319–346.
 
 Neumann, Iver B."Russia as a great power, 1815–2007." Journal of International Relations and Development 11.2 (2008): 128–151. online
 O'Brian, Patrick K. Atlas of World History (2007) Online 
 Peden, G. C. "Suez and Britain's Decline as a World Power." Historical Journal55#4 (2012), pp. 1073–1096. online
 Pella, John & Erik Ringmar, (2019) History of international relations Online  
 Shifrinson, Joshua R. Itzkowitz. Rising titans, falling giants: how great powers exploit power shifts (Cornell UP, 2018).
 
 Ward, Steven. Status and the Challenge of Rising Powers (2018) excerpt from book; also online review
 
 Xuetong, Yan. Leadership and the rise of great powers (Princeton UP, 2019).

External links
 Rising Powers Project publishes Rising Powers Quarterly (2016- )

Military terminology
International relations
Hegemony
International relations theory
Types of countries
Political science terminology
19th-century neologisms
Political terminology